Fundamentals: Ten Keys to Reality (2021) is a popular science book about advanced physics by Nobel laureate Frank Wilczek.

According to the author:

Part I. What There Is (chapters 1–5)
 Chapter 1. There's Plenty of Space
 Chapter 2. There's Plenty of Time
 Chapter 3. There Are Very Few Ingredients
 Chapter 4. There Are Very Few Laws
 Chapter 5. There's Plenty of Matter and Energy

Part II. Beginnings and Ends (chapters 6–10)
 Chapter 6. Cosmic History is an Open Book
 Chapter 7. Complexity Emerges
 Chapter 8. There's Plenty More to See
 Chapter 9. Mysteries Remain
 Chapter 10. Complementarity Is Mind-Expanding

Reception

According to Marcia Bartusiak’s review in The Washington Post:

According to Nell Freudenberger’s review in The New York Times:

References

External links
 
  (discussion between Wilczek and Brian Greene)
 

2021 non-fiction books
American non-fiction books
English-language books
Popular physics books
Popular science books
Penguin Press books